2020 Visions (sometimes called 20/20 Visions) is a science fiction comic book written by Jamie Delano and drawn by four artists. Originally serialized as a twelve-issue full-color limited series from 1997 to 1998 at the Vertigo imprint of DC Comics, it was later collected in black-and-white in a 2004 hardcover by Cyberosia Publishing and a 2005 trade paperback by Speakeasy Comics. A new edition of the trade paperback was released in color in 2019 by ComicMix.

Overview
The series consists of four different stories told over three issue arcs, each having its own artist, and each blending a different genre with prospective science-fiction:

 "Lust For Life" - horror-like (art by Frank Quitely, covers by John Eder)
 "La Tormenta" - crime-like (art by Warren Pleece, covers by John Eder)
 "Renegade" - western-like (art by James Romberger, covers by Stephen John Phillips)
 "Repro Man" - romance-like (art by Steve Pugh, covers by Stephen John Phillips)

With all stories taking place in the year 2020, they are all loosely connected by a genetic relationship between the main protagonist of each tale.

Collected editions
The collected editions include an introduction by Richard Kadrey:

Reception
Publishers Weekly commented that "the William Burroughs-influenced squalor and grotesquerie that Delano indulges in constantly have no real payoff" and described the art for the final two arcs as "ugly and frequently unclear". While admiring Delano's "plenty of clever ideas [...] unfortunately, it all doesn't hold together as a single book".

References

External links
 2020 Visions at ComicVine
1999 interview of Jamie Delano w/ color art from 2020 Visions. Archived from the original on August 19, 2001.
 2008 review by Kaustubh Thirumalai of the first arc on KvltSite . Archived from the original on June 26, 2008.
1997 comics debuts
Cyberpunk comics

1998 comics endings
Vertigo Comics limited series